The Aheloy or Achelous is a river in eastern Bulgaria. It originates in the Aytos-Karnobat mountain, 1.5 kilometres from Dryankovets, and flows directly into the Black Sea south of the village of Aheloy. The Aheloy River has a length of 39.9 kilometres and has an irrigation reservoir, the Aheloy Reservoir, built along its flow. The river's drainage basin covers 141 square kilometres and its average discharge is 0.7 cubic metres per second.

The river is famous for being the site of the Battle of Achelous of 20 August 917 between Bulgarian ruler Simeon I and the Byzantines under Leo Phocas, one of the largest battles in the Middle Ages and one of the greatest military successes of the First Bulgarian Empire.

References

 

Rivers of Bulgaria
Landforms of Burgas Province
Tributaries of the Black Sea